Martina Strutz (born 4 November 1981 in Schwerin) is a German pole vaulter.

Biography

She finished fifth in women pole Vault at the London 2012 Summer Olympics. She finished fifth at the 2000 World Junior Championships in Santiago, fifth at the 2006 European Athletics Championships in Gothenburg and fourth at the 2006 IAAF World Cup in Athens. Her personal best is 4.80 metres, achieved in August 2011 in Daegu.

Competition record

Personal life 
In 2015, Strutz married her partner Steffi.

See also
 Germany all-time top lists - Pole vault

References

External links 
 
 

1981 births
Living people
Sportspeople from Schwerin
German female pole vaulters
German national athletics champions
Athletes (track and field) at the 2012 Summer Olympics
Athletes (track and field) at the 2016 Summer Olympics
Olympic athletes of Germany
German LGBT sportspeople
Lesbian sportswomen
LGBT track and field athletes
World Athletics Championships medalists
European Athletics Championships medalists
World Athletics Championships athletes for Germany